Nationality words link to articles with information on the nation's poetry or literature (for instance, Irish or France).

Events
February 25 – English poet Ted Hughes and American poet Sylvia Plath meet in Cambridge, England. 
June 16 – Ted Hughes and Sylvia Plath marry at the church of St George the Martyr, Holborn, London and spend the night at his flat at 18 Rugby Street.
September 6 – American poet Richard Eberhart, having been sent by The New York Times to San Francisco to report on the poetry scene there, publishes this day an article in the New York Times Book Review titled "West Coast Rhythms" which helps call national attention to Allen Ginsberg's Howl as "the most remarkable poem of the young group" of poets who are becoming known as the spokesmen of the Beat Generation. On November 1, Howl and Other Poems, is published by City Lights Bookstore.
The Lake Eden campus of Black Mountain College, the birthplace of the Black Mountain School of poetry, closes, although classes do not end until the spring of 1957, and the final issue of the Black Mountain Review is published in the fall of 1957.
Quadrant magazine is founded in Australia by Richard Krygier, a Polish-Jewish refugee who had been active in social-democrat politics in Europe,  and James McAuley, a Catholic poet.
 Northern Review, founded in 1945 from the merger of two small Canadian literary magazines, Preview and First Statement, publishes its last issue.
 Tamarack Review founded by Robert Weaver in Canada

Works published in English
Listed by nation where the work was first published and again by the poet's native land, if different; substantially revised works listed separately:

Australia
 James McAuley, A Vision of Ceremony

Canada
 Leonard Cohen, Let Us Compare Mythologies, Canada
 R. A. D. Ford, A Window on the North
 Louis Dudek, The Transparent Sea. Toronto: Contact Press, 1956.
 Eldon Grier, Poems
 Irving Layton, The Bull Calf and Other Poems. Toronto: Contact Press.
 Irving Layton, The Improved Binoculars: Selected Poems. Introduction by William Carlos Williams. Highlands, NC: Jonathan Williams.
 Irving Layton, Music on a Kazoo. Toronto: Contact Press.
 W.W.E. Ross, Experiment 1923-1929, Contact Press.
 Raymond Souster, The Selected Poems. Louis Dudek ed. Toronto: Contact Press.
 Raymond Souster ed. Poets 56: Ten Younger English-Canadians. Toronto: Contact Press.
 Wilfred Watson, Even Your Right Eye

New Zealand
 Robert Chapman and Jonathan Bennett, editors, An Anthology of New Zealand Verse, Oxford University Press
 D'Arcy Cresswell, The Voyage of the Hurunui : a Ballad, Christchurch: Caxton Press
 Charles Doyle, A Splinter of Glass<ref name=nzenc>"Denis Glover" article in The Encyclopedia of New Zealand, 1966 website, accessed April 21, 2008</ref>

India in English
 Einar Beer, Samadhi Poems and Autumn Rains ( Poetry in English ), Alvdal: The Brahmakul;
 Humayun Kabir, Mahatma & other Poems ( Poetry in English ),

United Kingdom
 Kingsley Amis, A Case of Samples: Poems 1946–1956 Paul Dehn, For Love and Money J. P. Fletcher, Tally 300 David Gascoyne, Night Thoughts John Holloway, The Minute and Longer Poems, Hessle, East Yorkshire: Marvell Press
 Christopher Logue, Devil, Maggot and Son Norman MacCaig, Riding Lights, London: Hogarth Press
 Edwin Muir, One Foot in Eden E. J. Scovell, The River Steamer, and Other Poems Fredegond Shove (died 1949), PoemsUnited States
 John Ashbery, Some Trees John Berryman, Homage to Mistress Bradstreet, New York: Farrar, Straus & Cudahy
 Gwendolyn Brooks, Bronzeville Boys and Girls Witter Bynner, A Book of Lyrics Robert Creeley, If You Kenneth Fearing, New and Selected Poems Robert Fitzgerald, In the Rose of Time: Poems 1931–1956 Allen Ginsberg, Howl Anne Morrow Lindbergh, The Unicorn, and Other Poems W. S. Merwin, Green with Beasts, New York: Knopf (reprinted as part of The First Four Books of Poems, 1975)
 Kenneth Rexroth (translator), 30 Spanish Poems of Love and Exile and (translator), 100 Poems from the Chinese Edna St. Vincent Millay, Collected Poems Marianne Moore, Like a Bulwark Gertrude Stein, Stanzas in meditation and Other Poems (1929–1933) Peter Viereck, The Persimmon Tree John Hall Wheelock, Poems Old and New Reed Whittemore, An American Takes a Walk Richard Wilbur, Things of This World: Poems, New York: Harcourt, Brace
 Tennessee Williams, In the Winter of CitiesWorks published in other languages
Listed by language and often by nation where the work was first published and again by the poet's native land, if different; substantially revised works listed separately:

France
 Louis Aragon, Le Roman inachevé Aimé Césaire, Cahier d'un retour au pays natal, definitive, revised edition
 Pierre Jean Jouve, Lyrique Henri Michaux, Misérable miracle, about his experiences taking mescaline
 Jules Supervielle, L'Escalier Tristan Tzara, pen name of Sami Rosenstock, Le fruit permisGermany
 W. Höllerer, editor, Transit, anthology, German
 Rupert Hirschenauer and Albrecht Weber, editors, Wege zum Gedicht, 2 volumes (second volume, on the ballad, in 1963), Germany, scholarship
 Walther Killy, Wandlungen des lyrischen BildesIndia
In each section, listed in alphabetical order by first name:

Dogri

 Dinu Bhai Pant, Dadi Te Mam Shambhu Nath Sharma, Bhadasa Shuk Dev Shastri, Svacchanda Trivani, verses celebrating traditional values and patterned on Sanskrit meters
 Tara Smail Puri, Fauji Pimsanar, a long poem on the plight of a military veteran

Gujarati
 Bhatt Damodar Kesavaji, pen name "Sudhansu", Alakhtano, Gujarati
 Dhirubhai Thaker, Arvacin Gujarati Shaityani Vikasrekha, a Gujarati-language history of that language's literature from 1850 to the post-independence period
 Natvarlal Kuberdas Pandya 'Ushnas', Nepathye, longer poems based on new interpretations of mythological characters; Gujarati
 Suresh Joshi, Upjati, Indian, Gujarati language

Kannada
 C. Mahadevappa, translation from the English of Percy Bysshe Shelley's The Defence of Poetry Channaveera Kanavi, Dipadhari, with some lyrics in the navodaya style, others in the navya;  poetry known as Samanvaya Kavya in Kannada poetry because it attempted to synthesize the two types of subject matter: both the beauty of nature, folk traditions, mysticism, and humanism of the one form and the stark contemporary realism of the other
 Yarmunja Ramachandra, Vidaya, the author's only book of poems, published posthumously after his death at age 22

Malayalam
 O. N. V. Kurup, Dahikkunna Panapatram, Malayalam, the author's earliest poems, mostly lyrics reflecting revolutionary idealism
 Sreedhara Menon, Vittumkaikkottum, Malayalam
 Sukumar Azhikode, Ramananum Malayala Kavitayum, critical study in Malayalam of Changampuzha's RamananUrdu
 Faiz Ahmad Faiz, Zindan Nama Mirza Muhammad Muqimi Bijapuri, Candar badan va Mahayar, edited by Muhammad Akbaruddin Siddiqi, narrative poems
 Nadim, "Subuhdam Yets Chhu Paratshyon Gashi-Tarukh", the first sonnet in the Kashmiri language; published in the Urdu publication TameerOther Indian languages
 Harekrushna Mahadab, Chayapathara Yatri, Oriya
 Kunvar Narayan (also spelled in English as Kunwar Narain), Cakravyuha (has also been transliterated into English as Chakravyooh), New Delhi: Radhakrishan Prakashan, ; Hindi-language
 Parsram Rohra, Sargam, Sindhi
 Sankha Ghosh, Dinguli Ratguli, the author's first book of poems, Bengali

Spanish language
 Mario Benedetti, Poemas de oficina ("Office Poems"), Uruguay
 José Santos Chocano, Las mejores poesías de Chocano, pról. de Francisco Bendezú (Lima: Editorial Paracas), Peru
 Juan Gelman, Violín y otras cuestiones, Argentina
 Octavio Paz,  La estación violenta, Mexico

Other languages
 Miron Białoszewski's first book: Obroty rzeczy, Poland
 Zbigniew Herbert's first book: Struna światła, Poland
 Harry Martinson, Aniara, Swedish
 Eugenio Montale, La bufera e altro ("The Storm and Other Things"), a first edition of 1,000 copies, Venice: Neri Pozza; second, larger edition published in 1957, Milan: Arnaldo Mondadore Editore; Italy
 Nizar Qabbani, Poems (قصائد), Syrian poet writing in Arabic
 Yevgeny Yevtushenko, Stantsiia Zima (Станция Зима, "Zima Station", translated as "Winter Station"), Soviet Union

Awards and honors
 Consultant in Poetry to the Library of Congress (later the post would be called "Poet Laureate Consultant in Poetry to the Library of Congress"): Randall Jarrell appointed this year.
 National Book Award for Poetry: W. H. Auden, The Shield of Achilles Pulitzer Prize for Poetry: Elizabeth Bishop: Poems - North & South Queen's Gold Medal for Poetry: Edmund Blunden
 Bollingen Prize: Conrad Aiken
 Fellowship of the Academy of American Poets: William Carlos Williams
 Adonais Prize (Spain): María C. Lacaci, Humana voz Canada: Governor General's Award, poetry or drama: A Window on the North, Robert A.D. Ford 

Births
Death years link to the corresponding "[year] in poetry" article:
 January 1 – John O'Donohue (died 2008), Irish poet, author, priest, and philosopher
 January 21 – Ian McMillan, English poet
 March 11 – Jean "Binta" Breeze (died 2021), Jamaican dub poet
 April 7 – Dionisio D. Martinez, Cuban-born poet who grows up speaking Spanish, raised first in Spain, then in the United States
 May 9 – Henri Cole, Japanese-born American poet
 May 22 – Lucie Brock-Broido (died 2018), American poet
 August 15 – Henry Normal, born Pete Carroll, English performance poet and television comedy producer
 August 21 – Julia Darling (died 2005), English fiction writer, poet and dramatist
 September 26 – Mick Imlah (died 2009), Scottish-born poet
 October 7 – Diane Ackerman, American poet and naturalist
 October 30 – Annie Finch, American poet, librettist and theorist
 Also:
 Bai Hua, Chinese poet
 Jim Daniels, American poet, writer and academic
 Forrest Gander, American poet, essayist and translator
 Amy Gerstler, American poet
 Lachlan Mackinnon, Scottish-born poet and critic
 Amir Or, Israeli poet

Deaths
Birth years link to the corresponding "[year] in poetry" article:
 January 31 – A. A. Milne, 74 (born 1882), English author of children's books and children's poetry
 March 11 – Aleksanteri Aava, 72 (born 1883), Finnish poet 
 March 23 – Mitsuko Shiga 四賀光子, pen name of Mitsu Ota (born 1885), Japanese, Taishō and Shōwa period tanka poet, a woman
 March 30 – Edmund Clerihew Bentley, 80 (born 1875), popular English novelist and humorist and inventor of the clerihew, an irregular form of humorous verse on biographical topics
 April 2 – Kōtarō Takamura 高村 光太郎 (born 1883), Japanese poet and sculptor; son of sculptor Takamura Kōun
 May 11 – Takashi Matsumoto 松本たかし (born 1906), Japanese, Shōwa period professional haiku poet in the Shippo-kai haiku circle, then, starting in 1929, in the Hototogisu group that also included Kawabata Bosha; founded a literary magazine, Fue'' ("Flute"), in 1946
 May 15 – Arthur Talmage Abernethy (born 1872), American poet, journalist, theologian, minister; North Carolina Poet Laureate 1948–53
 June 22 – Walter de la Mare, 83 (born 1873), English poet, short story writer and author of children's books
 July 7 – Gottfried Benn (born 1886), German expressionist poet; buried in Dahlem Waldfriedhof, Berlin
 July 8 – Giovanni Papini, 75 (born 1881), Italian poet, essayist, journalist, literary critic, and novelist
 July 11 – Dorothy Wellesley, 70, English socialite, author, poet and literary editor
 August 31 – Percy MacKaye, 81 (born 1875), American playwright and poet
 September 7 – Frank Oliver Call (born 1878), Canadian poet and academic
 November 21 – Aizu Yaichi (会津 八一) (born 1881), Japanese poet, calligrapher and historian (Surname: Aizu)

See also

 Poetry
 List of poetry awards
 List of years in poetry

Notes

20th-century poetry
Poetry